Euaspis edentata is a species of leaf-cutting bee in the genus Euaspis, of the family Megachilidae. It is found from parts of India, and Sri Lanka.

References
 http://www.atlashymenoptera.net/biblio/Karunaratne_et_al_2006_Sri_Lanka.pdf
 https://www.academia.edu/7390502/AN_UPDATED_CHECKLIST_OF_BEES_OF_SRI_LANKA_WITH_NEW_RECORDS
 http://www.discoverlife.org/mp/20q?search=Euaspis+edentata&flags=subgenus:&mobile=iPhone
 http://animaldiversity.org/accounts/Euaspis_edentata/classification/
 http://www.repository.naturalis.nl/document/149987

Megachilidae